Penobscot County is a county in the U.S. state of Maine, named for the Penobscot people in Wabanakik. As of the 2020 census, the population was 152,199. Its county seat is Bangor. The county was established on February 15, 1816, from part of Hancock County when the area was still part of Massachusetts. Penobscot County is home to the University of Maine.

Penobscot County comprises the Bangor, ME Metropolitan Statistical Area.

Geography
The county highpoint is East Turner Mountain at 2456 ft next to Baxter State Park.

Adjacent counties
Aroostook County – north
Washington County – southeast
Hancock County – south
Waldo County – southwest
Somerset County – west
Piscataquis County – northwest

National protected area
 Sunkhaze Meadows National Wildlife Refuge

Demographics

2000 census
At the 2000 census there were 144,919 people, 58,096 households, and 37,820 families living in the county.  The population density was 43 people per square mile (16/km2). There were 66,847 housing units at an average density of 20 per square mile (8/km2).  The county's racial makeup was 96.60% White, 0.49% Black or African American, 1.00% Native American, 0.70% Asian, 0.03% Pacific Islander, 0.23% from other races, and 0.96% from two or more races.  0.61% of the population were Hispanic or Latino of any race. 17.8% were of English, 17.3% United States or American, 14.0% French, 13.0% Irish and 6.7% French Canadian ancestry. 95.8% spoke English and 2.3% French as their first language.
There were 58,096 households, of which 30.10% had children under the age of 18 living with them, 51.50% were married couples living together, 9.90% had a female householder with no husband present, and 34.90% were non-families. 26.70% of households were one person and 10.00% were one person aged 65 or older.  The average household size was 2.38 and the average family size was 2.88.

The age distribution was 22.80% under the age of 18, 11.30% from 18 to 24, 29.00% from 25 to 44, 23.80% from 45 to 64, and 13.10% 65 or older.  The median age was 37 years. For every 100 females there were 95.30 males.  For every 100 females age 18 and over, there were 92.30 males.

The median household income was $34,274 and the median family income  was $42,206. Males had a median income of $32,824 versus $23,346 for females. The per capita income for the county was $17,801. About 9.70% of families and 13.70% of the population were below the poverty line, including 15.00% of those under age 18 and 11.10% of those age 65 or over.

2010 census
At the 2010 census, there were 153,923 people, 62,966 households, and 38,917 families living in the county. The county's racial makeup was 95.4% white, 1.2% American Indian, 0.9% Asian, 0.8% black or African American, 0.2% from other races, and 1.5% from two or more races. Those of Hispanic or Latino origin made up 1.1% of the population. In terms of ancestry, 20.9% were English, 17.2% were Irish, 9.4% were American, 7.1% were German, 6.0% were French Canadian, and 5.9% were Scottish.

Of the 62,966 households, 27.5% had children under the age of 18 living with them, 47.1% were married couples living together, 10.3% had a female householder with no husband present, 38.2% were non-families, and 28.0% of households were made up of individuals. The average household size was 2.33 and the average family size was 2.82. The median age was 39.9 years.

The county's median household income was $42,658 and the median family income was $54,271. Males had a median income of $41,094 versus $31,910 for females. The county's per capita income was $22,977. About 10.1% of families and 15.7% of the population were below the poverty line, including 20.4% of those under age 18 and 9.2% of those age 65 or over.

Politics
As the most populous county in Maine's 2nd congressional district, Penobscot County's support for Donald Trump in 2016 helped deliver him a split electoral vote from Maine. It was the first time since 1828 that Maine split its electoral votes.

|}

Communities

Cities
 Bangor (county seat)
 Brewer
 Old Town

Towns

 Alton
 Bradford
 Bradley
 Burlington
 Carmel
 Charleston
 Chester
 Clifton
 Corinna
 Corinth
 Dexter
 Dixmont
 East Millinocket
 Eddington
 Edinburg
 Enfield
 Etna
 Exeter
 Garland
 Glenburn
 Greenbush
 Hampden
 Hermon
 Holden
 Howland
 Hudson
 Kenduskeag
 Lagrange
 Lakeville
 Lee
 Levant
 Lincoln
 Lowell
 Mattawamkeag
 Maxfield
 Medway
 Milford
 Millinocket
 Mount Chase
 Newburgh
 Newport
 Orono
 Orrington
 Passadumkeag
 Patten
 Plymouth
 Springfield
 Stacyville
 Stetson
 Veazie
 Winn
 Woodville

Plantations
 Carroll Plantation
 Drew Plantation
 Seboeis Plantation
 Webster Plantation

Census-designated places

 Bradley
 Corinna
 Dexter
 East Millinocket
 Hampden
 Howland
 Lincoln
 Mattawamkeag
 Milford
 Millinocket
 Newport
 Orono
 Patten

Unorganized territories

 Argyle
 East Central Penobscot
 Kingman
 North Penobscot
 Prentiss
 Twombly Ridge
 Whitney

Indian reservation
Penobscot Indian Island Reservation

Education
School districts include:

 Bangor School District
 Brewer School District
 Burlington Public Schools
 Carroll Plantation School District
 Drew Plantation School District
 East Millinocket School District
 Glenburn School District
 Greenbush School District
 Indian Island School District
 Hermon School District
 Lakeville School District
 Lowell School District
 Medway School District
 Milford School District
 Millinocket School Department
 Orrington School District
 Regional School Unit 19
 Regional School Unit 22
 Regional School Unit 26
 Regional School Unit 34
 Regional School Unit 89
 School Administrative District 23
 School Administrative District 30
 School Administrative District 31
 School Administrative District 41
 School Administrative District 46
 School Administrative District 63
 School Administrative District 64
 School Administrative District 67
 School Administrative District 68
 Seboeis Plantation School District
 Veazie School District
 Woodville School District
 Penobscot Unorganized Territory

University of Maine is in Orono.

See also
National Register of Historic Places listings in Penobscot County, Maine

References

External links
Penobscot County Official Website
Penobscot County on Maine.gov
"The Ancient Penobscot, or Panawanskek". Historical Magazine, February 1872.

 

 
Maine counties
Maine placenames of Native American origin
1816 establishments in Massachusetts
Populated places established in 1816